Viktor Viktorovich Shaytar (born 13 February 1983) is a Russian racing driver. He is a current member of the SMP Racing driver programme.

Career

Russian Formula 1600 Championship
Born in Moscow, Shaytar began racing in his native Russia in 2002, winning the Russian Formula 1600 Championship from the first attempt. Shaytar remained in the championship till 2007, but wasn't able to repeat his success, finishing as runner-up in 2007.

Formula Three
Shaytar moved to the Formula Three class in 2008, racing in the Finnish and Russian Formula Three Championship for the Artline Engineering. He finished second in the standings of the Finnish championship and third in the standings of the Russian championship. In 2009 he raced in the Oschersleben round of the Trophy Class of the German Formula Three Championship.

Legends Russia
After one-year hiatus, Shaytar returned to racing in 2011, competing in the Russian Legends series. He stayed in the series for 2012 and won seven from twelve races.

Sportscar racing
In 2013, Shaytar made his sports car racing debut, participating in the 2013 Blancpain Endurance Series with SMP Racing (also he became part of SMP Racing programme). He and Kirill Ladygin finished as runner-up in the Pro-Am standings after winning the finale at Nürburgring. Also he raced with Fabio Babini and Kirill Ladygin in the GTC class of the 2013 European Le Mans Series. Despite missing opening round, they were absolutely dominant, winning all four races that they have competed, winning the category title.

For the next year Shaytar switched to the LM GTE category of the European Le Mans Series, joining Andrea Bertolini and Sergey Zlobin. They won two races on the way to LM GTE class win. He also raced with Kirill and Anton Ladygin in the LMP2 Class of the 2014 FIA World Endurance Championship. Shaytar raced in the LMGTE Am class of the 2014 24 Hours of Le Mans. But he crashed on the lap 196, retiring his Ferrari 458 Italia GT2.

In 2015 Shaytar moved to the LMGTE Am class of the 2015 FIA World Endurance Championship, Andrea Bertolini and Aleksey Basov joined him in the team. His squad won 2015 24 Hours of Le Mans in the LMGTE Am category. Also Shaytar's car was victorious at Nürburgring and Austin. That consistency lead to the title in the LMGTE Am class.

After two races in the LMP2 class of the 2015 European Le Mans Series with BR Engineering BR01 prototype, Shaytar joined Vitaly Petrov and Kirill Ladygin in the LMP2 Class of the 2016 FIA World Endurance Championship. They had podium in the LMP2 Class of the 2016 24 Hours of Le Mans, which was their only highlight during the season. Also he raced with Aleksey Basov in the 2016 GT3 Le Mans Cup and won the title after three race wins.

Shaytar returned to the Blancpain GT Series Endurance Cup in 2017, teaming up with Miguel Molina and Davide Rigon in the Pro class. Their best result was during 1000 km Paul Ricard, when they finished on podium behind the race winners Bentley M-Sport, leading to the fourth in the season standings. He again competed in the LMP2 class in the 2017 24 Hours of Le Mans alongside Mikhail Aleshin and Sergey Sirotkin.

For 2018, Shaytar is scheduled to race in the LMP2 class of the 2018 European Le Mans Series and in the 2018 24 Hours of Le Mans.

Racing record

Career summary

24 Hours of Le Mans results

References

External links

1983 births
Living people
Sportspeople from Moscow
Russian racing drivers
European Le Mans Series drivers
Blancpain Endurance Series drivers
24 Hours of Le Mans drivers
FIA World Endurance Championship drivers
24H Series drivers
SMP Racing drivers
German Formula Three Championship drivers
WeatherTech SportsCar Championship drivers
AF Corse drivers
Target Racing drivers
Le Mans Cup drivers